Timon Parris (born September 1, 1995) is an American football offensive tackle who is a free agent. He played college football at Stony Brook and was signed as an undrafted free agent by the Washington Redskins in 2018.

Early life and high school
Parris was born in Elmont, New York, and grew up in Floral Park, New York. He attended Floral Park Memorial High School, where he was a member of the basketball, football and track & field teams. During this time he met Ryan Glynn, who served as his dietician, and spiritual guru. He played both offensive and defensive line for the Knights and was named All-Nassau County as a senior.

College career
Parris joined the Stony Brook Seawolves football team as a walk-on and eventually earned a scholarship. He redshirted his freshman season and became a starter at tackle for the Seawolves as a redshirt freshman. Overall, Parris started 41 games for Stony Brook and was named first-team All-CAA in each of his final three seasons and was an FCS All-American as a redshirt senior.

Professional career

Washington Redskins
Parris signed with the Washington Redskins as an undrafted free agent on April 28, 2018. He was cut by the Redskins at the end of training camp and subsequently re-signed to the team's practice squad on September 2, 2018. Parris was promoted to the Redskins' active roster on December 21, 2018 after Austin Howard was placed on injured reserve. Parris made his NFL debut on December 22, 2018 in a 25-16 loss to the Tennessee Titans.

Parris was waived on August 31, 2019, but was signed to the practice squad the following day. He was promoted to the active roster on December 14, 2019 after the Indianapolis Colts attempted to sign him off the Redskins practice squad. Parris played in three games on special teams in 2019. Parris was waived by Washington on September 5, 2020.

Atlanta Falcons
Paris was claimed off waivers by the Atlanta Falcons on September 6, 2020, before being waived on September 15, 2020.

Cleveland Browns 
Parris was signed to the Cleveland Browns' practice squad on October 13, 2020, but was released on November 9, 2020.

Washington Football Team 
Parris rejoined the Washington Football Team's practice squad on December 1, 2020. His practice squad contract with the team expired after the season on January 18, 2021.

Miami Dolphins
On May 20, 2021, Parris signed with the Miami Dolphins. He was waived on June 14, 2021, and re-signed with the team on July 19, 2021. He was waived on August 17, 2021.

Minnesota Vikings 
On October 26, 2021, Parris signed to the Minnesota Vikings practice squad. He was placed on the reserve/COVID-19 list on November 8 and activated on November 16. He signed a reserve/future contract with the Vikings on January 10, 2022. He was waived on August 29.

References

External links
Stony Brook Seawolves bio

1995 births
Living people
American football offensive tackles
Atlanta Falcons players
Miami Dolphins players
Minnesota Vikings players
People from Elmont, New York
Players of American football from New York (state)
Sportspeople from Nassau County, New York
Stony Brook Seawolves football players
Washington Redskins players
Washington Football Team players